Premante Inte is a 2006 Indian Telugu-language romantic drama movie starring Navdeep and Poonam Bajwa, directed by Ramana BV. It is a remake of the Hindi movie Socha Na Tha.

Plot
Veeru (Navdeep) has a crush on Lizi (Rupali). But he isn't bold enough to get across his emotions to her. His rich family meanwhile wants him to marry another rich girl Pavani (Poonam Bajwa). But she is also not positively inclined towards marriage. So Veeru and Pavani hatch a plan and scupper the match. Therefore, there is some friction between the families. Meanwhile, Veeru and Pavani strike a good friendship. And he also opens his heart to Lizi. Initially his family opposes the arrangement as she is a Christian. Eventually they agree to the marriage. But on the day of the marriage, Veeru realizes that he is actually in love with Pavani.

Cast 

Navdeep  as Veeru
Poonam Bajwa as Pavani
Jackie
 Rupali as Lizi
Naresh
Sarath Babu
Annapoorna
Aishwarya
Satya Krishnan

Soundtrack 
Music by Koti.

Reception
Navya Vaitla of Telugu Cinema wrote that "Bad screenplay, poor characterization and lack of freshness are the major flaw. Despite some good moments, you end up feeling it is not that good film in the end. Very very average film".

References

External links
 

2006 films
2000s Telugu-language films
Indian romantic comedy films
2006 romantic comedy films
Films scored by Koti
Telugu remakes of Hindi films